Rrasë is a former municipality in the Elbasan County, central Albania. At the 2015 local government reform it became a subdivision of the municipality Belsh. The population at the 2011 census was 1,594. The municipal unit consists of the villages Shegas, Rrasë e Sipërme, Guri i Bardhë and Rrasë e Poshtme.

See also
Guri i Bardhë

References

Administrative units of Belsh
Former municipalities in Elbasan County